The Williamsburg Community School District is a small, rural, public school district in Blair County, Pennsylvania. According to 2000 federal census data, it serves a resident population of 3,740.

School Facilities
 Williamsburg Elementary School was built in 1942 with additions in 1955 and 1999, when the last renovation to the structure was completed. Grades K-6
 Williamsburg High School was originally constructed in 1917 with additions in 1937, 1942, 1964, and 1979. WHS was renovated in 1999. Grades  7–12

Extracurriculars
The district offers a variety of clubs, activities and sports.

Athletics
The District funds:
 Baseball – Class A
 Basketball Boys – Class A
 Basketball Girls – Class A
 Football – Class A
 Softball – Class A
 Volleyball – Class A

Junior High School Sports

Boys
Baseball
Basketball
Football

Girls
Basketball
Softball
Volleyball 

According to PIAA directory July 2012

References

External links
 Williamsburg Community School District
 PIAA

School districts in Blair County, Pennsylvania
School districts established in 1917